Binchester is a small village in County Durham, England. It has a population of 271. It is situated between Bishop Auckland, which is to the south, and a short distance to the west of Spennymoor. It has a community centre, swing park and football field, and is surrounded by countryside. Granville Terrace, the main road through the village, was relaid and renovated in 1991 for the BBC television series Challenge Anneka.

Nearby is Binchester Roman Fort.

Etymology
Binchester almost certainly takes the first element of its name from the first element of the earlier Roman name Vinovia. This was Anglicised with the addition of the Old English word ceaster '(Roman) fortification' and perhaps through identification with the Old English word binn 'manger'.

References

External links

Villages in County Durham